is a 2011 Japanese psychological-body horror film directed by Noboru Iguchi and the eighth installment and reboot of the Tomie film series.

Plot
Tsukiko Izumikawa (Moe Arai) is a member of the photography club in high school. On her way home with her best friend Yoshie Kazuya (Aika Ota), Tsukiko runs into her elder stepsister Tomie Kawakami (Miu Nakamura) who goes to the same high school. Tomie is with Toshio Shinoda (Kensuke Owada) - a guy that Tsukiko has a secret crush on. Tsukiko is consumed with jealousy towards her stepsister, but at the same time is intoxicated with Tomie's beauty. Per Tomie's request, Tsukiko takes a few pictures of her. At that time Tomie tells her stepsister that she knows that she is jealous of her closer relationship with Toshio. When Tsukiko stops taking pictures, Tomie is crushed on her neck by a steel cross that falls from a building under construction, killing her.

One year later, Tsukiko's daily life slowly returns to some sense of normality, but she still suffers from grief and recurring nightmares over her stepsister's death. On Tomie's 18th birthday, her parents, Masashi Kawakami (Kouichi Ohori) and Kimiko Izumikawa (Maiko Kawakami) and Tsukiko stand around a birthday cake in her honor. At that time someone knocks on their door. When Tsukiko goes to get the door, she sees that it is her deceased sister; Tomie stands in the doorway with her beauty shining even more brightly than before. Her parents are delighted to see Tomie and welcome her back in joyful tears, while Tsukiko is confused.

Tomie manages to get Masashi to whip Tsukiko across the back with a steam iron cable as punishment for not showing affection towards her. Tomie's behavior starts becoming increasingly bizarre and abnormal as she shows Tsukiko the scar on her neck that begins to evolve into a deranged, talking tumor. Tsukiko is disgusted and horrified by Tomie's tumor and she calls Tomie a "monster". Offended, Tomie decides to leave but is prevented from doing so when her father stabs and kills her with a butcher knife.

The next morning, Tsukiko witnesses Kimiko dismembering Tomie's body in the bathroom. Kimiko then disposes of Tomie's head by throwing it away in the trash bin and goes to prepare Tsukiko's school lunch, accidentally dropping several chunks of Tomie's flesh and hair in it. At school, Tsukiko notices a girl who looks exactly like her dead stepsister walk into class. Later on, during lunch break, Tsukiko opens her lunch pack and sees several miniature Tomie heads in it. She runs off and throws the lunch pack into the trash. When Yoshie goes to look for Tsukiko, she hears noises in the trash and leans over to investigate. Suddenly, the miniature Tomie heads appear and strangle Yoshie with their abnormally long tongues, killing her.

Meanwhile, at home, Tomie's head rises from the trash bin and convinces her father to kill his wife and feed her body to her. Back at school, Tsukiko encounters Yoshie with a tumor on her neck similar to the one Tomie had and runs off in panic. When Yoshie enters the Judo club's room while looking for Tsukiko, she is decapitated by the members who mistook her head for the tumor's. Her headless body comes back to life and starts chasing the Judo club members. Tsukiko then walks into Toshio, witnessing him stab a Tomie to death, and a new Tomie forms out of the blood and begins kissing Toshio. Tsukiko kills Toshio and runs off into a locker room and encounters several versions of Tomie.

Just as she is about to be cornered by the Tomies, she wakes up in her bed. Her parents inform her that she is an only child and that she never had a sister when she asks about Tomie. Tsukiko sighs in relief, believing she just had a bad nightmare which proves to be false when her father starts eating hair and her mother's head suddenly stretches abnormally to the point where it appears to be upside down. Her mother chases her with a knife but is attacked by a carnivorous centipede made out of Tomie's heads. Tsukiko runs upstairs and encounters Toshio and Yoshie who tell her that they never liked her and were pretending to be her friends all along. She pushes them down the stairs and they are both attacked by the centipedes. Tsukiko then encounters a huge giant Tomie head in her living room, and after a brief conversation, the sisters reconcile, and the Tomie centipedes begin crawling over her.

The movie ends has Tsukiko is shown walking out of the house, having become another Tomie. As she walks through the streets of Japan, she observes other women she passes by, many of them also being Tomie. She walks up to a man, smiling, and is then shown being murdered by him in an apartment. Lying on the floor, she looks at a mirror, retaining some degree of her original personality. However, the reflection she sees in the mirror is of Tomie, her original stepsister, who asks Tsukiko if she is happy.

Cast
 Moe Arai – Tsukiko Izumikawa
 Miu Nakamura – Tomie Kawakami
 Aika Ota – Yoshie Kazuya
 Maiko Kawakami – Kimiko Izumikawa
 Kensuke Owada	– Toshio Shinoda
 Kouichi Ohori	– Masashi Kawakami
Miho Kanno, Runa Nagai, Mai Hōshō, Miki Sakai, Rio Matsumoto, Anri Ban, Yû Abaru, Miu Nakamura and Emiko Matsuoka as other Tomie copies (cameos)

Release
Unlimited had its international premiere at the Fantasia Festival on July 31, 2011.

References

External links
 Official website  
 
Review  at Japanverse.com

2011 horror films
2011 films
Films directed by Noboru Iguchi
Japanese horror films
Japanese sequel films
Live-action films based on manga
Tomie (film series)
Japanese psychological horror films
Body horror films
2010s Japanese films